Androstenediol, or 5-androstenediol (abbreviated as A5 or Δ5-diol), also known as androst-5-ene-3β,17β-diol, is an endogenous weak androgen and estrogen steroid hormone and intermediate in the biosynthesis of testosterone from dehydroepiandrosterone (DHEA). It is closely related to androstenedione (androst-4-ene-3,17-dione).

Biological activity
Androstenediol is a direct metabolite of the most abundant steroid produced by the human adrenal cortex, DHEA. It is less androgenic than the related compound, Δ4-androstenediol, and has been found to stimulate the immune system. When administered to rats, androstenediol, in vivo, has approximately 1.4% of the androgenicity of DHEA, 0.54% of the androgenicity of androstenedione, and 0.21% of the androgenicity of testosterone.

Androstenediol possesses potent estrogenic activity, similarly to DHEA and 3β-androstanediol. It has approximately 6% and 17% of the affinity of estradiol at the ERα and ERβ, respectively. Although androstenediol has far lower affinity for the ERs compared to the major estrogen estradiol, it circulates at approximately 100-fold higher concentrations, and so is thought may play a significant role as an estrogen in the body.

Chemistry

Androstenediol, also known as androst-5-ene-3β,17β-diol, is a naturally occurring androstane steroid. It is closely related structurally to androstenedione (A4; androst-4-ene-3,17-dione), dehydroepiandrosterone (DHEA; androst-5-en-3β-ol-17-one), and testosterone (androst-4-en-17β-ol-3-one), as well as to 3β-androstanediol (5α-androstane-3β,17β-diol).

Derivatives and analogues of androstenediol, such as the 17α-substituted methandriol (17α-methylandrostenediol) and ethinylandrostenediol (17α-ethynylandrostenediol) as well as the naturally occurring 19-norandrostane derivative norandostenediol (19-nor-5-androstenediol), have been synthesized and studied. Methandriol and its esters are androgens and anabolic steroids while ethinylandrostenediol is an estrogen.

Research

Radiation countermeasure
Androstenediol has been investigated for use as a radiation countermeasure. Its value as a radiation countermeasure is based mainly on its stimulation of production of white blood cells and platelets. Its potential use as a radiation countermeasure was developed by the Armed Forces Radiobiology Research Institute (AFRRI) and subsequently studied by AFRRI and Hollis-Eden Pharmaceuticals under the proposed brand name Neumune for the treatment of acute radiation syndrome.

The clinical trials with rhesus monkeys were successful. According to the Hollis-Eden report, only 12.5% of the 40 Neumune-treated animals died versus 32.5% in the placebo group.

Hollis-Eden had applied for a contract from the U.S. Government under the BioShield Request for Proposals (RFP) for radiation countermeasures. After being encouraged for 2.5 years that Neumune was in the competitive range, on March 9, 2007, the RFP was canceled by HHS. According to HHS, "the product was no longer in the competitive range". No further explanation was given. As a result, Hollis-Eden has now withdrawn from the radiation countermeasure field.

Additional images

References

Androgens and anabolic steroids
Androstanes
Estrogens
Pregnane X receptor agonists
Selective ERβ agonists